Iron Reagan is an American crossover thrash supergroup from Richmond, Virginia, consisting of Municipal Waste vocalist Tony Foresta, Cannabis Corpse and Municipal Waste bassist Phil "LandPhil" Hall, former A.N.S. guitarist Mark Bronzino, former Darkest Hour drummer Ryan Parrish, and Hellbear bassist Rob Skotis. Since their formation in 2012, they have released three full-length albums, one EP and two split EPs. Their 2014 album The Tyranny of Will peaked at 22 on the Billboard 200.

History

2012–2013: Formation, Demo 2012 and Worse Than Dead 
Iron Reagan originally formed in 2012 and consisted of members Tony Foresta of Municipal Waste, Paul Burnette formerly of Darkest Hour, Phil Hall of Cannabis Corpse and Municipal Waste, Mark Bronzino formerly of A.N.S., and Ryan Parrish also formerly of Darkest Hour. The name of the band is a pun on the heavy metal band Iron Maiden and the 40th president of the United States, Ronald Reagan.

That year, the group released their first demo, Demo 2012, through Tankcrimes Records which featured the tracks "Pay Check", "Eat Shit and Live", "Artificial Saints", "Running Out of Time" and "Walking Out". The first two tracks went on to be featured in their debut full-length album.

On March 20, 2013, the band released their debut studio album Worse Than Dead through the record label A389 Recordings. It was produced by guitarist Phil Hall. The album received a score of 5 out of 10 by Exclaim!, saying, "they're basically indistinguishable from their singer and guitarist's main band. Iron Reagan are rounded out by ex-members of Darkest Hour, but their influence isn't nearly as prominent as the crossover thrash of Municipal Waste."

Bassist Paul Burnette left the band and was replaced by Mark Bronzino  who late switched to guitar and was replaced by Rob Skotis of Hellbear.

2014–2015: Spoiled Identity EP, Tyranny of Will and split EPs 
On January 7, 2014, Iron Reagan and death metal band Exhumed released a split EP entitled Exhumed/Iron Reagan on Tankcrimes. The first side of the record contained four tracks by Exhumed, while the second side contained four tracks by Iron Reagan.

The band independently released their first extended play, Spoiled Identity EP, on April 1, 2014, as a free online download. The EP featured 13 tracks and was under five minutes in total length. A 2015 limited edition re-release on vinyl included two bonus tracks.

Iron Reagan signed onto Relapse Records and released their second full-length studio album on September 16, 2014. The Tyranny of Will received generally better reviews than their previous studio album. Like that album, this one was also produced by Phil Hall.

In 2015, Iron Reagan released another split EP, this time with Toxic Shock through Reflections Records. The first side of the record featured three tracks by Iron Reagan and the second side featured three tracks by Toxic Shock.

2016–present: Crossover Ministry 
The band began recording of their third full-length album in summer 2016. The album was announced through Relapse and was released on February 3, 2017. It received positive reviews on release. Exclaim! gave the album and 8 out of 10 and stated in their review, "Overall though, Crossover Ministry is a well-made crossover thrash album that's sure to be a hit with fans of the genre, and could be the selling point for people just getting into it." As with the previous releases, Phil Hall produced the album.

On January 14, 2020, it was announced the band had parted ways with bassist Rob Skotis over sexual misconduct allegations.

Members

Current
 Tony Foresta – vocals (2012–present)
 Phil "LandPhil" Hall – rhythm guitar (2012–present)
 Ryan Parrish – drums (2012–present)

Former 
 Paul Burnette – bass (2012–2013)
 Rob Skotis – bass  (2013–2020)
 Mark Bronzino – lead guitar (2013–2021)

Timeline

Discography

Studio albums
Worse Than Dead (2013, A389 Recordings)
The Tyranny of Will (2014, Relapse Records)
Crossover Ministry (2017, Relapse Records)

Demos
 Demo 2012 (2012, Tankcrimes)

EPs
Spoiled Identity EP (2014, Independent)
Dark Days Ahead EP (2018, Pop Wig Records)

Splits
Exhumed/Iron Reagan (2014, Tankcrimes)
Iron Reagan/Toxic Shock (2015, Reflections Records)
Iron Reagan/Gatecreeper (2018, Relapse Records)

See also
 Ronald Reagan in music

References

External links

 Iron Reagan on BandCamp
 

Crossover thrash groups
American thrash metal musical groups
Heavy metal musical groups from Virginia
2012 establishments in Virginia
Musical groups established in 2012
Hardcore punk groups from Virginia
Musical quintets
Heavy metal supergroups